Panchari is a village and municipality in Udhampur district of the Indian union territory of Jammu and Kashmir. The town is located 40 kilometres from the district headquarters Udhampur.

Transport

Road
Panchari village is well-connected by road to other places in Jammu and Kashmir and India by the NH 44.

Rail
The nearest major railway stations to Panchari are Shri Mata Vaishno Devi Katra railway station and Udhampur railway station located at a distance of 57 kilometres and 40 kilometres respectively.

Air
The nearest airport to Panchari is Jammu Airport located at a distance of 95 kilometres and is a 3-hour drive.

See also
Jammu and Kashmir
Udhampur district
Udhampur

References

Villages in Udhampur district